Gavere is a municipality located in the Belgian province of East Flanders. In 2021, Gavere had a total population of 13,007. The total area is 31.35 km².

Sports

The Superprestige Gavere is a November cyclo-cross race held in Gavere, Belgium, which is part of the Superprestige.

Military 
The Air Traffic Control center of the Belgian Air Component was based in Semmerzake.

See also 
 Lamoraal van Egmont, Prince of Gavere

References

External links

 Official website 
 Webpage at Internet Archive

 
Municipalities of East Flanders
Populated places in East Flanders